Zékemzougou is a town in the Bingo Department of Boulkiemdé Province in central western Burkina Faso. As of 2005, Zékemzougou has a population of 1,132.

References

External links
Satellite map at Maplandia

Populated places in Boulkiemdé Province